Jago Mohan Pyaare is an Indian Marathi language comedy and supernatural fantasy show which aired on Zee Marathi. It starred Atul Parchure, Shruti Marathe and Supriya Pathare in lead roles. The series aired on Zee Marathi by replacing Dil Dosti Dobara.

Plot 
The story revolves around a frustrated common man, Mohan, a middle class tailor who lives in chawl with his dominating wife and mother-in-law. After that a fairy enters his life to help him with all the difficulties and soon his life takes a magical turn.

Cast

Main 
 Atul Parchure as Mohan Mhatre
 Supriya Pathare as Shobha Mohan Mhatre
 Shruti Marathe as Mohini / Bhanumati; Mohan's servant (fairy)

Recurring 
 Usha Naik / Ragini Samant as Leelavati; Shobha's mother
 Maithili Patwardhan as Mau; little fairy
 Bhargavi Chirmule as Mohan's boss, Tailor Shop's owner
 Disha Danade as Anjali
 Atharva Sanjay as Manish
 Prithvik Pratap as Rahul
 Meera Sarang as Madhuri
 Sandeep Juwatkar as Madan
 Vandana Marathe as Aaji
 Madhavi Juvekar as Shanta
 Vijay Nikam as Police Inspector

Reception

Special episode (1 hour) 
 17 September 2017
 10 November 2018

Ratings

Airing history

References

External links 
 
 Jago Mohan Pyaare at ZEE5

Marathi-language television shows
2017 Indian television series debuts
Zee Marathi original programming
2018 Indian television series endings